Minolops arata is a species of sea snail, a marine gastropod mollusk in the family Solariellidae.

Description
The height of the shell attains 7 mm, its diameter 9.5 mm.
The widely unibilicate, rather thin shell has a turbinate shape. Its colour is pale yellow, with purple disposed in dots on the shoulder and stripes on the base. The five whorls are tabulate above, angled at the shoulder, thence rounded, last in slight contact with its predecessor. The sutures are impressed.

Sculpture: the flat sutural shelf of the upper whorls is ornamented by fine regular radial riblets. Obliquely descending the slope, these riblets crenulate the upper spirals and gradually vanish on the body whorl into faint irregularly spaced growth lines. On the upper whorls are five spiral cords, between which are smaller threads, in their turn separating still finer lines. The body whorl is encircled by ten strong keels whose interstices are occupied by small and smaller
threads as before. The apex is elevated and consists of two small and glossy whorls. The umbilicus is wide and deep, penetrated by five elevated spiral ridges beaded by longitudinal sculpture. The aperture is circular, slightly oblique. The peristome is entire, simple, and sharp, within brilliantly nacreous, nacre edged with a thin brown and a broader yellow non-nacreous margin.

Distribution
This marine species is endemic to Australia and occurs from Queensland to Victoria

References

 Iredale, T. (1929). Mollusca from the continental shelf of eastern Australia. Records of the Australian Museum. 17 (4): 157-189, pls 38-41
 Iredale, T. & McMichael, D.F. (1962). A reference list of the marine Mollusca of New South Wales. Memoirs of the Australian Museum. 11 : 1-109
 Wilson, B. (1993). Australian Marine Shells. Prosobranch Gastropods. Kallaroo, WA : Odyssey Publishing. Vol.1 1st Edn pp. 1�408.

External links
 To World Register of Marine Species
 

arata
Gastropods of Australia
Gastropods described in 1903